Basketball Wives is an American reality television series franchise on VH1. It chronicles the everyday lives of women romantically linked to men in the professional basketball industry.

The original incarnation was filmed in Miami, Florida and premiered on April 11, 2010. Basketball Wives LA, a spin-off based in Los Angeles, premiered on August 29, 2011. Both shows ran for five seasons.

On March 27, 2017, VH1 announced that Basketball Wives would be revived for a sixth season, with its setting relocated to Los Angeles, effectively combining the casts of both the original series and its spinoff. Subsequent seasons have also featured this hybrid cast.

On April 18, 2022, VH1 renewed the series for a tenth season, which premiered on May 16, 2022.

Franchise history

Basketball Wives (Miami) (2010–13)
The first season premiered on April 11, 2010, and ran for eight weeks in 30-minute episodes. The announced cast included Jennifer Williams, wife of Eric Williams, Evelyn Lozada, ex-fiancé of Antoine Walker, Mesha O'Neal, wife of Jermaine O'Neal, Royce Reed, former NBA team dancer and the mother of Dwight Howard's oldest son, Faith Rein, Udonis Haslem's girlfriend, and Shaunie O'Neal, wife of Shaquille O'Neal, who would also serve as an executive producer on the series. Mesha and Faith were replaced by Michael Olowokandi's ex-girlfriend Suzie Ketcham and Matt Barnes' fiancée Gloria Govan when the show aired. Erikka Moxam, ex-girlfriend of Rasual Butler, appeared in a supporting role. A spin-off, Football Wives, featuring the wives and girlfriend of professional football players, aired from October 24 to December 19, 2010.

The show was renewed for a second season of hour-long episodes, which premiered on December 12, 2010. Tami Roman, ex-wife of Kenny Anderson, was added to the cast, replacing Gloria Govan who was demoted to a supporting role, alongside Juli Richmond, wife of Mitch Richmond, Kimberli Russell, wife of Bryon Russell, and Ashley Walker, mother of Rafer Alston's children. Meeka Claxton, wife of Speedy Claxton, joined the cast in season three, which premiered on May 30, 2011 to 1.8 million viewers.

The fourth season premiered on February 20, 2012, following the spin-off Basketball Wives LA, which concluded in November 2011. Meeka departed the series and was replaced by new cast members Kesha Nichols, ex-fiancée of Richard Jefferson, and Kenya Bell, wife of Charlie Bell. On March 12, 2012, VH1 announced the spin-off Ev and Ocho, starring Evelyn Lozada and her fiancé Chad Ochocinco, set to air that September. However, three weeks before the show was to premiere, they shelved the series, following Ochocinco's arrest for assaulting Lozada, and subsequent divorce.

The fifth season premiered on August 19, 2013, following the second season of Basketball Wives LA, which concluded in December 2012. Tasha Marbury, wife of Stephon Marbury, joined the cast, while Royce, Jennifer and Kesha were dropped from the series. Kenya would return in the season finale. According to a 2014 tweet from Tami Roman, the show was quietly canceled.

Basketball Wives LA (2011–16)

On June 20, 2011, VH1 announced that they had expanded the franchise to Los Angeles. The announced cast for Basketball Wives LA  included Kimsha Artest, wife of Ron Artest, Gloria Govan and her sister Laura Govan, Jackie Christie, wife of Doug Christie, and Imani Showalter, ex-fiancée of Stephen Jackson. Malaysia Pargo, wife of Jannero Pargo, and Draya Michele, a model and aspiring actress with a history of dating basketball players, were announced as cast members a month later. Tanya Williams, wife of Jayson Williams, would also appear, however, was quickly phased out of the show along with Kimsha Artest, who admittedly stopped showing up for filming because of the "shenanigans and drama". The series premiered on August 29, 2011, to 1.81 million viewers.

The show was renewed for a second season, which premiered on September 10, 2012, attracting 1.82 million viewers. Imani Showalter quit the show and moved back to New York, and was replaced by Brooke Bailey, girlfriend of Vernon Macklin. Adiz "Bambi" Benson, Malaysia's friend and an aspiring rapper, appeared in a supporting role.

Following the cancellation of the original Basketball Wives, executive producer Shaunie O'Neal announced that the cast of Basketball Wives LA would be retooled for season three. Filming began in August 2013, with new members British Williams, fiancée of Lorenzo Gordon, Brandi Maxiell, wife of Jason Maxiell, and Sundy Carter, mother of Larry Hughes's daughter. Gloria and Laura Govan confirmed their exit, as did Brooke Bailey. The third-season premiere acquired 1.95 million viewers, the show's highest-rated at the time. This season is also the first and only of the series to reach over 2 million viewers for six consecutive weeks.

Season four began production in November 2014 and wrapped in April 2015. The season premiered on July 12, 2015 to 1.90 million viewers, moving from Monday to Sunday nights. Shaunie O'Neal and Bad Girls Clubs Mehgan James joined the cast, with Tyreke Evans's ex-girlfriend Angel Brinks, Eddy Curry's wife Patrice Curry, and Tami Roman appearing in supporting roles.

On September 23, 2015, the show was renewed for a fifth season. Filming began in January 2016 and wrapped in June, with Draya Michele and Mehgan James departing from the show. They were replaced by Tami Roman and Angel Brinks, who were promoted to the main cast, and new cast members LaTosha Duffey, fiancée of Iman Shokuohizadeh, and Angel Love, girlfriend of DeJuan Blair. It premiered on July 17, 2016 to 1.58 million viewers and a 0.5 in the adults 18–49 rating demographic, making it the lowest rated premiere for the series. It was followed by the spin-off, Shaunie's Home Court, starring Shaunie O'Neal, which aired on VH1 for two seasons.

Basketball Wives (2017-present)
On March 27, 2017, VH1 announced that the show would be retooled, airing under its original moniker Basketball Wives after nearly four years off the air. The sixth season premiered on April 17, 2017. Basketball Wives Evelyn Lozada would return to the franchise with Basketball Wives LA Jackie Christie and Malaysia Pargo, along with Shaunie O'Neal and Tami Roman who starred in both incarnations. Basketball Wives Jennifer Williams and Basketball Wives LA Brandi Maxiell would return in supporting roles, with new cast members Keonna Green, ex-girlfriend of Nick Young, Bonnie-Jill Laflin, girlfriend of Kareem Rush, Elena Ahanzadeh, Joe Crawford's girlfriend Cristen Metoyer and her sister Aja, stylist Saniy'yah Samaa, and Hazel Renee.

Jennifer was promoted to the main cast in season seven, which premiered on May 14, 2018. New cast members included Kristen Scott, wife of former league coach Thomas Scott, CeCe Gutierrez, girlfriend of Byron Scott, and professional athlete Ogom “OG” Chijindu, girlfriend of basketball player Kwame Alexander. All cast members returned for season eight, premiering on June 19, 2019 along with Feby Torres, ex-girlfriend of Lance Stephenson. Tami Roman departed the show halfway through the season, citing other career opportunities, as well as CeCe. After over a year long hiatus due to the COVID-19 pandemic, the show returned for a ninth season on February 9, 2021, with new cast members Liza Morales, ex-girlfriend of Lamar Odom, Nia Dorsey, ex-girlfriend of Lance Stephenson and her sister Noria Dorsey, wife of Shawn Taggart.

On April 18, 2022, VH1 announced the show's return for a tenth season, which premiered on May 16, 2022. Following the conclusion of the ninth season, Evelyn Lozada announced her departure from the series in April 2022, while Kristen Scott, Ogom Chijindu, Feby Torres and Liza Morales were not asked back by producers. For the tenth season, three of the five cast members from the previous season returned. Jackie Christie, Malaysia Pargo and Jennifer Williams were joined by former Basketball Wives LA alumnas, Angel Brinks, Brandi Maxiell, Brooke Bailey, Brittish Williams and LaTosha Duffey. In addition to this, Shaunie O'Neal, Nia- and Noria Dorsey made multiple guest appearances throughout the season. 
 
On August 1, 2022, during the mid-season finale of season 10, VH1 announced that additional episodes will air soon. On January 23, 2023, VH1 confirmed that the second half will premiere on February 13, 2023. After the sixteenth episode of the tenth season, Pargo exited the show, making Christie the last original basketball wife from the LA series.

Cast timeline

Note:

Series overview

Spin-offs

Football Wives
A spin-off, Football Wives, featuring the wives and girlfriend of professional football players, aired from October 24 to December 19, 2010.

Ev and Ocho
On March 12, 2012, VH1 announced the spin-off Ev and Ocho, starring Evelyn Lozada and her fiancé Chad Ochocinco, set to air that September. However, three weeks before the show was to premiere, they shelved the series, following Ochocinco's arrest for assaulting Lozada, and subsequent divorce.

Shaunie's Homecourt
On June 30, 2016, VH1 announced it's new series "Shaunie's Home Court," which will follow O'Neal behind-the-scenes at home, where she spends the days tending to her brood of five, ranging in age from 10 to 19 years old. Shaunie's Home Court aired for two seasons.

Baller Wives
A third spin-off, Baller Wives, featuring the wives and girlfriends of professional football players, aired from August 14 to September 11, 2017.

Shaunie and Keion's Destination "I Do"
On May 18, 2022, MTV Entertainment Studios announced that a wedding special, featuring Shaunie embarking on a second chance at love with Pastor Keion Henderson, is set to air later that year on VH1. On November 7, 2022, TheWrap reported that O'Neal and Keion would be starring in a three-week-event series, 'Shaunie and Keion's Destination "I Do", and released an exclusive first look clip. The show would make its series premiere on November 28, 2022.

Proposed projects
Since 2015, Shaunie O'Neal has discussed expanding the franchise to other cities, such as Houston, Dallas and Orlando.

On July 12, 2017, Saniy'yah Samaa alleged that a spin-off in New York was in the works and had been cast, but VH1 never green-lit the project. During an interview she said the following: "I was sought out to do Basketball Wives in 2014. I was asked by someone on the show if I knew of any girls that would be good for the show, because we were doing Basketball Wives: New York."

Specials

Basketball Wives LA Overtime Special
On October 31, 2010, Tami Roman hosted a half-hour Basketball Wives LA overtime special in which she sat down with Jackie Christie and Laura Govan about the change of tide in episode ten and what it may mean to the ladies in the final episodes of the first season.

Basketball Wives Showdown: Evelyn vs. Tami
On March 27, 2017, VH1 announced a pre-season special entitled "Basketball Wives Showdown: Evelyn vs. Tami" set to premiere on April 10, 2017 highlighting fan favorite moments from Evelyn Lozada and Tami Roman's past seasons.

Tami Ever After
Tami Roman and boyfriend Reggie Youngblood starred in their own, hour-long special on June 19, 2019 on VH1. It followed Roman, 49, and longtime love Reggie Youngblood as they take the next step in their relationship.

Notes

References

External links

 
2010s American reality television series
2010 American television series debuts
2013 American television series endings
2017 American television series debuts
African-American reality television series
Television shows set in Miami
Television shows set in Los Angeles
Television shows set in New York City
VH1 original programming
English-language television shows
Women in Florida
Women in New York City
Women in California